The Freeman Parkway Bridge is a deck arch bridge located in Glen Ridge, New Jersey. The bridge crosses over Toney's Brook and the Montclair-Boonton Line, a train line which runs to New York City.

Statistics

The bridge itself is made of concrete and its one span is 149.9 feet long. It was built in 1926 and is open to street traffic. Freeman Parkway is a short street, and its name changes to Highland Avenue a few hundred feet north of the bridge.

Death of Jeremy Duncker

In October 2012, 18-year-old Jeremy Duncker, a senior at Glen Ridge High School, was found underneath the bridge, near the railroad tracks. An autopsy determined that the cause of death was accidental.

References

Bridges completed in 1926
Bridges in Essex County, New Jersey
Glen Ridge, New Jersey
Concrete bridges in the United States
Open-spandrel deck arch bridges in the United States
Road bridges in New Jersey